Uneasy Virtue is a 1931 British comedy film directed by Norman Walker and starring Fay Compton, Edmund Breon, Francis Lister, Donald Calthrop, and Garry Marsh. It was produced by British International Pictures and shot at the company's Elstree Studios The film was based on the 1927 West End play The Happy Husband by Harrison Owen.

Synopsis
A loyal wife cultivates the impression that she has affairs with a variety of other men.

Cast
 Fay Compton as Dorothy Rendell
 Edmund Breon as Harvey Townsend
 Francis Lister as Bill Rendell
 Margot Grahame as Stella Tolhurst
 Donald Calthrop as Burglar
 Garry Marsh as Arthur Tolhurst
 Dodo Watts as Sylvia Fullerton
 Adele Dixon as Consuelo Pratt
 Hubert Harben as Frank K. Pratt
 Gerard Lyley as Sosso Stephens
 Margaret Yarde as Mrs Robinson
 Molly Lamont as Ada

References

Bibliography
 Low, Rachael. Filmmaking in 1930s Britain. George Allen & Unwin, 1985.
 Wood, Linda. British Films, 1927-1939. British Film Institute, 1986.

External links

1931 films
1931 comedy films
1930s English-language films
British comedy films
Films shot at British International Pictures Studios
British films based on plays
Films set in England
Films directed by Norman Walker
British black-and-white films
1930s British films